The Women's Open de France - Nantes 2019 is the women's edition of the 2019 Open International de Squash de Nantes, which is a tournament of the PSA World Tour event World Tour Silver (Prize money: $73,500).

The event took place at the Château des ducs de Bretagne in Nantes in France from 9 to 14 of September.

Camille Serme won his first Open International de Nantes trophy, beating Amanda Sobhy in the final.

Prize money and ranking points
For 2019, the prize purse was $73,500. The prize money and points breakdown is as follows:

Seeds

Draw and results

See also
Men's Open de France - Nantes 2019
Open International de Squash de Nantes
2019–20 PSA World Tour

References

External links
PSA Open International de Squash de Nantes 2018 Tournament
Open International de Squash de Nantes official website

2019 in French sport
2019 in squash
Open international de squash de Nantes
Open de France